Jed Jones was an American tennis player active in the early 20th century.

Tennis career
Jones reached the semifinals of the U.S. National Championships in 1906 (losing to William Clothier) and the quarterfinals in 1905, 1908 and 1911.

Grand Slam tournament performance timeline

References

1872 births
1960 deaths
American male tennis players
Tennis people from Massachusetts